Lygodactylus keniensis, also known as Parker's dwarf gecko or Kenya dwarf gecko, is a species of gecko found in northern Kenya, southern Somalia, southern Ethiopia, and eastern Uganda.

References

Lygodactylus
Reptiles described in 1936
Taxa named by Hampton Wildman Parker
Reptiles of Ethiopia
Reptiles of Kenya
Reptiles of Somalia
Reptiles of Uganda